Benbane Head, or Benbane, is the northernmost point of mainland Northern Ireland. It is in County Antrim, near the Giant's Causeway, which lies between Causeway Head and Benbane Head. The nearest settlements are Bushmills and Portballintrae.

References

Headlands of County Antrim